The Alamo Drafthouse Cinema is an American cinema chain founded in 1997 in Austin, Texas, which is famous for serving dinner and drinks during the movie, as well as its strict policy of requiring its audiences to maintain proper cinema-going etiquette.

It has multiple locations across the United States, including eighteen (with several more being built) across Texas. Outside of Texas, it has five locations in Virginia  (Winchester, Charlottesville, Woodbridge, Crystal City and Ashburn). There are three locations in Colorado (Denver, Westminster and Littleton) and New York (Yonkers, Brooklyn, Staten Island and Lower Manhattan), as well as two locations in Missouri (St. Louis and Springfield), and California (San Francisco and Los Angeles). There are individual locations in Chicago; Washington, D.C.; Woodbury, Minnesota; La Vista, Nebraska; and Raleigh, North Carolina.

Others are planned to be built in Birmingham, Alabama;Glendale, Colorado; Fayetteville, Arkansas and Boston. In March 2021, Alamo Drafthouse filed for bankruptcy but emerged from the situation three months later.

History
The Alamo Drafthouse Cinema was founded by Rice University alumni Tim and Karrie League at 409 Colorado St, in an Austin, Texas warehouse district building on Colorado St. (between 4th and 5th) that was being used as a parking garage.

The company began as a second-run movie theater, and distinguished itself by the food and drink service offered inside the theater, including cold beers, which continues to set Alamo Drafthouse apart from many other cinemas. The seating is arranged with rows of cabaret style tables in front of each row of seats, with an aisle between each row to accommodate waiter service. Customers write their orders on slips of paper, which are picked up by black-clad waiters.

Soon after opening, the original downtown theater began offering occasional unique programming such as silent movies scored by local bands playing live accompaniment, food-themed films such as Like Water for Chocolate served with a dinner matching the meals shown on screen, and retrospectives of various directors and stars. This includes location-based food options depending on the film setting.

In 2001, the Leagues renovated a four-screen art-house theater at 2700 Anderson Lane in North Austin, called Village Cinema, which had recently closed, and opened it as an Alamo Drafthouse which specialized in first-run movies. With this new Alamo Drafthouse Village, the downtown location ceased showing second-run movies and began to concentrate almost exclusively on unusual programming including classics, cult classics, independents, documentaries, special guest appearances, and audience participation shows.

In 2003, the Alamo Drafthouse opened on 13729 Research Boulevard in northwest Austin. The Alamo Drafthouse Lake Creek had seven screens, all dedicated to new movies. Almost simultaneously, the Alamo granted their first franchise, which opened in the West Oaks Mall in Houston, Texas.

In May 2003, Travis Doss opened the first Alamo franchise location (West Oaks Mall) in Houston, Texas with six screens.

In July 2004, Tim and Karrie League sold the brand, including the brand name, intellectual property and rights to all future Alamo Drafthouse expansion to the Alamo Drafthouse Cinemas CEO  Terrell Braly, John Martin, and David Kennedy, but retained an irrevocable license for the Austin locations (Village, Lamar, Downtown), which includes their Rolling Roadshow.

In August 2004, the second largest Alamo (Westlakes) opened in San Antonio, Texas with eight screens.

In August 2005, Entertainment Weekly named the Alamo Drafthouse Cinema "The #1 movie theater in the country doing it right".

Since February 2005, the new company has purchased the original franchise unit from Doss, opened a theater in the Katy Area and in Spring, Texas and built a new-build multi-screen theater in the Rio Grande Valley; though it was announced in 2006 to open, the building has remained unfinished since the original owner was foreclosed upon.

In 2006, due to rising rent in downtown Austin, theater owners took steps to hand the theater over to a non-profit group called the "Heroes of the Alamo" foundation, operating the theater as a cultural arts center. However, with the historic Ritz Theater on 6th Street offered as an alternative location, the original Alamo was closed. The final event at the original location consisted of a special triple-feature event the evening of June 27, 2007. The final movie shown was Night Warning, with star Susan Tyrrell attending.  At the conclusion of the movie, audience members were allowed to disassemble their seats and take them home as mementos of the theater.

Of the first seven theaters, the downtown Austin theater was unique for being the host of many important film events in Austin, such as the Quentin Tarantino Film Festival and Harry Knowles's annual Butt-numb-a-thon.

After six months of construction, the Alamo Drafthouse at the Ritz opened on November 2, 2007, with a triple feature of Matango: Attack of the Mushroom People, with a five course mushroom feast; a sneak preview of No Country For Old Men; and a Terror Thursday screening of War of the Gargantuas, introduced by Quentin Tarantino who flew out from Los Angeles for the night to attend the opening.

In 2009, the first outside of Texas was opened in Winchester, Virginia.

A second San Antonio theater opened in 2009 (Park North), with six screens.

In June 2010, founder Tim League was brought back in as CEO of the franchise operations.

A third San Antonio location (Stone Oak) opened November 5, 2010, with six screens.

In 2013, the Lake Creek location was closed upon the opening of the brand new, larger, Lakeline location. 

In June 2017, the current largest Alamo opened in Springfield, Missouri with 14 screens seating 1,050 people.

In March 2019, Business Insider reported that Alamo Drafthouse's movie-ticket subscription service, Alamo Season Pass, will launch nationwide at all Drafthouse theaters by the end of the year with the unlimited plan costing $20 a month in most regions of the country.

In March 2020, Alamo Drafthouse announced that all locations were closed temporarily due to the COVID-19 pandemic.

In May 2020, Alamo announced that former Starbucks Exec Shelli Taylor would become the new CEO of Alamo Drafthouse and that founder Tim League would transfer from his current role as CEO to become the chairman of the board of directors.

The company announced the launch of "Alamo on Demand" video streaming service on May 7, 2020. The streaming service will have films from Drafthouse Films, its film distribution arm, as well as partner with name-brand studios like Sony Pictures Classics and Lionsgate.

On March 3, 2021, Alamo Drafthouse filed chapter 11 bankruptcy. Among closing cinemas across the southern U.S., the plans to open the Orlando, Florida location was cancelled. The debtors are being represented by Young Conaway Stargatt & Taylor as counsel and Houlihan Lokey as investment banker. With $100 million to $500 million in both assets and liabilities, Alamo is entering into a restructuring support agreement to help guide them through their bankruptcy. In June 2021, the company announced that they had emerged from bankruptcy.

Locations
Italics indicate location has not officially opened yet

Alabama 
Alamo Drafthouse Birmingham - Birmingham, Alabama (9 screens, opening spring 2024)

Arkansas 

Alamo Drafthouse Fayetteville - Fayetteville, Arkansas (8 screens and Alamo's first permanent drive-in location, opening TBA 2024)

California 
New Mission Theater – San Francisco (opened December 17, 2015, includes Video Vortex video rental store)
The Bloc – Downtown Los Angeles (opened July 19, 2019, includes Video Vortex video rental store)

Colorado 
Alamo Drafthouse at Aspen Grove – Littleton (7 screens, opened March 2013)
Alamo Drafthouse Sloan Lake – Denver (8 screens, opened May 2017)
Alamo Drafthouse Westminster – Westminster (9 screens, opened Spring 2019)
Alamo Drafthouse Glendale - Glendale (opening late 2023)

District of Columbia 
Alamo Drafthouse D.C. Bryant Street (9 screens, opened December 2021)

Illinois 
Alamo Drafthouse Chicago (Wrigleyville, Chicago, Illinois, 6 screens, opened early 2023)

Massachusetts 
Alamo Drafthouse Boston (Seaport, Boston, Massachusetts, 10 screens, opening early 2023)

Missouri 
Alamo Drafthouse Springfield (14 screens; opened June 2017)
Alamo Drafthouse City Foundry – St. Louis (10 screens; opened December 2022) Minnesota 
Alamo Drafthouse Twin Cities – Woodbury (9 screens; opened summer 2018)

 Nebraska 
Alamo Drafthouse Omaha – La Vista (8 screens; opened October 31, 2015)

 New York 
 New York City 
 Alamo Drafthouse Downtown Brooklyn – Brooklyn in City Point (7 screens, opened October 28, 2016, includes Video Vortex video rental store) 
 Alamo Drafthouse Lower Manhattan – Financial District of Manhattan (14 screens, opened October 18, 2021, includes Kim's Video Underground video rental store)
 Alamo Drafthouse Staten Island (9 screens, opened July 22, 2022) 

 Other New York cities 
Alamo Drafthouse Yonkers (6 screens; opened August 5, 2013 includes Video Vortex video store) 

 North Carolina 
 Alamo Drafthouse Raleigh (11 screens, opened early 2018, includes Video Vortex video rental store) 

 Texas 
 Austin 
 Alamo Drafthouse Village (4 screens; opened July 2001)
 Alamo Drafthouse South Lamar (6 screens; opened March 7, 2005, closed January 3, 2013 as the 1950s era Lamar Plaza shopping center is demolished and rebuilt. Reopened in third quarter 2014 in new building with 9 screens on the same site.)
 Alamo Drafthouse Slaughter Lane (8 screens; opened on March 8, 2012)
 Alamo Drafthouse Lakeline (10 screens; opened July 2013)
 Alamo Drafthouse at Mueller (6 screens; opened March 2017)
 Alamo Drafthouse Cedar Park – Cedar Park (10 screens; opening TBA) Houston 
 Alamo Drafthouse LaCenterra (8 screens, replacing previous Mason Park location, July 2018)
 Alamo Drafthouse Sugar Land (opening 2022) Alamo Drafthouse League City (opening 2022) An additional location also being planned for the Houston area. San Antonio 
Alamo Drafthouse Park North (6 screens; opened November 2009)
Alamo Drafthouse Stone Oak (6 screens; opened on or after November 5, 2010)

 Dallas–Fort Worth 
Alamo Drafthouse Richardson (7 screens; opened August 2013 as first Dallas–Fort Worth area location) 
Alamo Drafthouse The Cedars (8 screens; opened 2016)
Alamo Drafthouse Las Colinas (opened April 2018)
Alamo Drafthouse Lake Highlands (opened March 2018)
Alamo Drafthouse Denton (opened June 2018)Alamo Drafthouse Grand Prairie (10 screens, opening early 2024)Alamo Drafthouse Frisco (TBA, will include Video Vortex video rental store) El Paso 
Alamo Drafthouse Montecillo Town Center (8 screens; opened May 6, 2016)
Alamo Drafthouse East El Paso (10 screens; opened March 24, 2021)

 Other Texas cities 
Alamo Drafthouse Lubbock (8 screens; opened April 25, 2014) 
Alamo Drafthouse Laredo (7 screens; opened September 4, 2015)
Alamo Drafthouse Corpus Christi (7 screens; opened February 2017)

 Virginia 
 Northern Virginia 
Alamo Drafthouse One Loudoun – Ashburn (9 screens; opened April 2013)
Alamo Drafthouse Woodbridge (8 screens, opened June 2018) 
Alamo Drafthouse Crystal City – Crystal City (9 screens, opened October 2022)

 Other Virginia cities 
 Alamo Drafthouse Winchester – Kernstown (8 screens; opened October 2009)
 Alamo Drafthouse Charlottesville (7 screens, opened July 2017) Worldwide 
Alamo Drafthouse Rolling Roadshow – Mobile unit operates worldwide

Former locations
 Arizona 
As of September 2021, all three locations were rebranded as Majestic Theaters.
Alamo Drafthouse Phoenix – Chandler (Planned 8 screen location in downtown Chandler, AZ abandoned due to construction issues, development taken over by Harkins Theatres. Alamo Holdings LLC later inked a $14.6 million lease on a location in south Chandler which opened on December 2, 2016)
Alamo Drafthouse Tempe (opened early 2018)
Alamo Drafthouse Gilbert (8 screens, opened November 2019)

 Missouri 
Alamo Drafthouse Mainstreet – Kansas City (6 screens; took over operations from AMC Theatres June 21, 2012; closure announced as part of bankruptcy restructuring in March 2021)

 Michigan 
Alamo Drafthouse Kalamazoo (10 screens; closed April 2017)

 Nebraska 
Alamo Drafthouse Midtown – Omaha (5 screens; opened Winter 2018; closed October 2022)

 Texas 
Alamo Drafthouse Downtown – Austin (single screen; opened 1997, closed 2007 to move to Ritz location)
Alamo Drafthouse Lake Creek – Austin (7 screens; opened May 2003; closed July 2013)
Alamo Drafthouse West Oaks Mall – Houston (6 screens; opened May 2003 as first Houston area location, closed June 25, 2012)
Alamo Drafthouse Vintage Park – Spring (7 screens; opened February 2013; sold December 6, 2016)
Alamo Drafthouse Mason Park – Katy Area (7 screens; opened February 2006, closed June 2018, replaced by LaCenterra location)
Alamo Drafthouse at the Ritz – Austin (2 screens; opened November 2007; closure announced as part of bankruptcy restructuring in March 2021)
Alamo Drafthouse Marketplace – New Braunfels (11 screens; opened December 20, 2013; closure announced as part of bankruptcy restructuring in March 2021)
Alamo Drafthouse Westlakes – San Antonio (9 screens; opened August 2004 as first San Antonio area location; closed mid 2021)
Alamo Drafthouse North Richland Hills (8 screens, opened April 2019; closed February 2021)

Cancelled expansions
 Texas 
Alamo Drafthouse Little Elm (8 screens; planned expansion abandoned in February 2016)
Alamo Drafthouse La Cantera La Cantera, San Antonio (sold the land for the expansion in fall 2021)

 Michigan 
 Alamo Drafthouse Midtown Detroit (9 screens; planned for 2020, cancelled late 2019)

 Florida 
Alamo Drafthouse Orlando (cancelled March 2021)

Etiquette
Alamo Drafthouse is famous for enforcing a strict policy on behavior while in the theater. Children under the age of two are not allowed, except for showings on specific days which are designated "Alamo For All" showings where parents are encouraged to bring young children, and rules around talking are relaxed. Unaccompanied minors are not allowed in showings, except for members of the Alamo Drafthouse's Victory Vanguard rewards program, which allows 15–17 year-olds to attend showings unattended after their application to the rewards program has been submitted and reviewed. The application involves demonstrating an understanding of the theater's policies around talking, texting, arriving to the theater late, and basic tipping etiquette.

The cinema also prohibits talking and texting during the film. Anyone who violates this policy is subject to warning and potential removal from the premises. Alamo made national headlines in 2011 when the rantings of one angry customer who was ejected for texting were included in its "Don't Talk or Text" PSA shown before films. "When we adopted our strict no talking policy back in 1997, we knew we were going to alienate some of our patrons," Tim League posted on the cinema's website. "That was the plan. If you can't change your behavior and be quiet (or unilluminated) during a movie, then we don't want you at our venue."

Fantastic Fest

Every year in September, the Alamo South Lamar location in Austin hosts a week-long film festival called Fantastic Fest dedicated to the horror, sci-fi, fantasy, Asian and "cult" film genres. Alamo Lake Creek holds the annual Zombie Film Festival (Dismember the Alamo) and the Off-centered Film Festival. The Ritz and South Lamar locations also participate in the SXSW Film Festival in March.

Other events include:
Action Pack – patrons are armed with cap guns in order to shoot at the screen during fun action films (often in-house pyrotechnics are performed as well)
Austin Air Guitar – each competitor has 60 seconds to perform air guitar to a song of one's own choosing
Austin Air Sex – same as the above except for sexual acts
Big Screen Classics – classic movies shown on a Cinemascope screen
Butt-Numb-A-Thon ("BNAT"), an annual 24-hour film marathon in honor of Harry Knowles's birthday in December, held from 1999 to 2016 at Drafthouse locations. Following sexual assault allegations against Knowles in September 2017, League said the Alamo had severed all ties with Knowles.
Celebrity Guests – special event where a famed film industry person or star speaks
Cinema Cocktails – bar service with at-seat waitered service during movies at the Ritz location
The Dionysium – monthly arts variety show including debate panels, lectures, forums, and socializing 
Filmmaking Frenzy – ongoing filmmaking competition with annual awards
Food & Film Events – special meal service for certain movies
Foleyvision – films which replace original audio with live commentary; formerly "Buzz Moran's Kung Fu Masterpiece Theater"
Kid's Club – free children's movie screenings last Saturday each month
Master Pancake Theater – live movie mockery; a panel of comedians, led by "Head Dude" John Erler, mock a movie as it is shown with live comedy voice-overs, real-time commentary, and some pre-selected movie editing; a successor to the former special event "Christmas Show"; content frequently Rated R.  Previously called "Mister Sinus Theater", until a cease and desist court order filed by Best Brains, holder of the Mystery Science Theater copyright, brought about the name-change.
MondoCon – Taking place the first weekend of Fantastic Fest, it focuses on the art and artists behind Mondo's posters and other collectibles. It also offers exclusive items, panels and screenings with filmmakers and artists.
Mondo Mystery Movie – infrequent event where the movie is unknown until it's played. Typically admission includes a poster.
Music Monday – weekly Monday music-related film showing
Open Screen Night – weekly; patrons show their own videos
Quote-Alongs – patrons can sing, quote, and perform along with a movie, typically a cult film
Rocky Horror Picture Show – weekly live performance tribute to the movie of the same name
Rolling Roadshow Tour – somewhat annual 35mm movie screenings of famous movies in famous film-related locations across the United States
Sing-Alongs – patrons sing along to musical films or a collection of music videos
Terror Tuesdays – weekly horror movie showing
Weird Wednesday – weekly eclectic movie showing for $1 at midnight

Rolling Roadshow
Alamo Drafthouse hosts 35mm screenings of famous movies in famous places all over the world with their traveling portable projection system and a blow-up screen.  Past events include: Fistful of Dollars at Cortijo el Sotillo, Spain, A Christmas Story in Cleveland, OH, The Lost Boys in Santa Cruz, CA, It Came From Outer Space 3D in Roswell, NM, The Goonies in Astoria, OR, Close Encounters of the Third Kind at Devil's Tower, WY, The Warriors in Coney Island, NY, Clerks in Red Bank, NJ, Jaws at Martha's Vineyard, MA, Field of Dreams at the Field of Dreams, IA, The Shining at the Stanley Hotel, CO, Poseidon Adventure on the Queen Mary, CA, Escape from Alcatraz on Alcatraz, CA, "Bottle Rocket" in Hillsboro, TX, just to name a few.

Drafthouse Films

In 2010, after the return of former co-founder Tim League as CEO, the company launched Drafthouse Films, a film distribution company named after, and inspired by, the Alamo Drafthouse Cinema chain.

Neon

In 2017, then CEO Tim League founded another film distribution company with Tom Quinn in New York City called Neon, which has earned a total of 12 Academy Award nominations. As of 2019, Tim League was reportedly not involved in the daily operations of Neon.

Birth.Movies.Death.Birth.Movies.Death. is a magazine and website formerly published by Alamo Drafthouse. The magazine and website provide news and commentary about films and the entertainment industry.

The sale of Birth.Movies.Death to Dallas Sonier's Cinestate film studio was announced in May 2020 concurrently with the stepping down of founder Tim League as CEO of Alamo Drafthouse.

Hostile workplace allegations
In October 2016, Devin Faraci resigned from Birth.Movies.Death.'' after allegations of sexual assault surfaced. Less than a year later, Tim League re-hired Faraci to write film blurbs for the 2017 Fantastic Fest. Upon discovery of Faraci's re-hiring, Todd Brown resigned as Fantastic Fest's director of international programming in early September 2017. Faraci resigned from writing for Fantastic Fest, and League made several public apologies regarding the matter.

Later in September 2017, several women accused Harry Knowles of sexual harassment and sexual assault at events sponsored by Alamo Drafthouse or in professional workplace settings. Subsequent to these revelations, Alamo Drafthouse and Fantastic Fest severed business ties with Knowles. League did not attend Fantastic Fest, opting instead to visit Alamo Drafthouse locations around the country to discuss workplace environment issues with employees. Despite these events, Alamo Drafthouse proceeded with plans to show a previously unreleased pornographic film by Ed Wood.

See also

 List of companies based in Austin, Texas

References

External links

Culture of Austin, Texas
Privately held companies based in Texas
Cinemas and movie theaters in Texas
American companies established in 1997
Entertainment companies established in 1997
Companies based in Austin, Texas
Movie theatre chains in the United States
1997 establishments in Texas
Companies that filed for Chapter 11 bankruptcy in 2021